The Solar Ark (ソーラーアーク) is a Japanese ark-shaped solar photovoltaic power generation facility which offers activities to cultivate a better appreciation of solar power generation, and thereby benefitting both ecology and science. This 315-meter-wide, 37-meter-tall facility is located in Anpachi, Gifu Prefecture, in the geographical center of Japan, and can be seen from the JR Tōkaidō bullet train, which runs past on an adjacent railway. It has over 5000 panels that produce approximately 530,000 kilowatt-hours on an annual basis and a maximum system power of 630 kilowatts.

Stationed at the center of the Solar Ark is the Solar Lab, a museum of solar energy.  A hands-on, outdoor light exhibition was planned for opening in 2005. The Solar Ark was an enterprise partner with the 2005 World Exhibition, Aichi Prefecture, Japan. It is one of the largest solar buildings in the world.

History

The Solar Ark was constructed by Sanyo Electric Co. Its development was accidental among other things.  Initially, Sanyo Electric had intended to create the largest photovoltaic system in the world, with a 3.4 megawatt output, to mark the organisation's 50th anniversary. By 1998, designers had already been in discussions about the Solar Ark's appearance. Sanyo had planned on using cutting edge solar technology available to them at the time, using a combination of crystal silicon and thin-film amorphous silicon with 14-15% efficiency. However, during the initial planning, Sanyo had to recall several monocrystalline cells, which were the predecessors of the hybrid technology mentioned before, due to insufficient output.

Sanyo Electric Co. still decided to go ahead with the Solar Ark's construction; however, instead of using the previously planned technology, Sanyo instead, used the recalled monocrystalline cells. Sanyo says “We have done this to show our sincere regret that this problem has occurred and to express our willingness and determination to both remember what happened and how important it is to maintain quality.” Construction was completed in December 2001.

Panasonic acquired Sanyo, and as part of its corporate restructuring and re-branding strategy, the red Sanyo logo on the Solar Ark was replaced with a blue Panasonic logo in August 2011.

In 2022, solar energy generation ended at the site. Panasonic sold the land to a Osaka real estate developer, and media reports indicate that the building will be demolished.

Design

The Solar Ark's design was inspired by the vision of an ark embarking on a journey to the 21st century. This idea led to the Solar Ark's size and overall symbolic shape of being an example of producing clean energy. In total, the construction area for the Solar Ark is 3294.48 m2 reinforced concrete was used for the base of the construction.  From one end to the other, the total length of the Solar Ark is 315 metres. The ark is 31.6 metres tall from the centre of the structure. There are 5,046 solar panels in total. Twelve single-crystal silicon solar cell modules per unit were assembled on the ground, and 470 units were lifted up and attached to the main body of the Solar Ark.

The weight of the actual body of the ark (pillars being excluded) is 3,000 metric tonnes and is constructed from structural steel. This construction material helps give the impression of the solar ark being suspended in the air. Each column is 2 metres in diameter and 31 meters in length and the Solar Ark is 315 metres long. The entire Solar Ark chassis is supported by four “G-Columns” which are custom built pillars by Kubota and in total, these pillars weigh approximately 5,000 tonnes. These high-quality pillars are homogeneous, the result of the seamless method of construction that utilizes centrifugal force. Due to the Solar Ark's sturdy building materials, the Ark is able to resist winds of up to 34 meters/second and level 7 earthquakes on the Japanese scale.

The ark is surrounded by 5-meter high water fountains and two ponds, each having their own cascade. The entrance to the Solar Ark has solar wings which are composed of HIT solar cells that generate electricity on the topside and underside while also functioning as awnings that allow sunlight to filter through. Between the individual solar panels, there are, in total, 75,000 red, green, and blue computer controlled LEDs which are activated at night to produce images and words across the ark.

Museum

The Solar Energy Museum is structurally separate from the Solar Ark itself. It is officially called the solar lab. It is a museum and exhibition center that mostly provides information about solar energy. There are several exhibitions, workshops and science classes held at the solar lab, which are primarily aimed at the younger generations, to help them become more aware of the photovoltaic science and how it impacts the world. The solar lab is divided into ten zones that provide a wide range of activities for visitors. Some of these activities include a solar system

simulator, an adventure wall, an artistic approach to the sun, a solar library and a control deck, where visitors can view real-time data related to the power being generated by the Solar Ark.

Awards

The Solar Ark has received several awards and notable achievements during its operation.

 Good Design Award 2002 Architecture and Environment Design/Architecture Design
 The 5th "Renewing Your Hometown" 21st Century Fine Art Awards (Honorable Mention)
 The 12th "Facilities that Publicize Energy" Award (Exhibition Category)
 The 12th Advertising Contest on the Environment, Grand Prix of Environment Advertising Award (Presented by State Minister for the Environment)  
 The 2nd Environment and Facility Prize, Outstanding Performance Award (Environmental Design Category)  
 Energy Publicity Center Award for PR Activity, the 14th Director-General of the Natural Energy Agency Award, 2004

References

External links

 Solar Ark —official site from Sanyo, includes Solar Energy Museum
 Some pictures of the Solar Ark
 "The Solar Ark: A Unique Solar Building In Japan", Metaefficient.com, April 28, 2007
 "Solar Goes Gorgeous with Sanyo's Solar Ark" by Steve Levenstein—A site that gives some nice pictures of the Ark and some additional detail
 —An article by Sanyo covering the HIT solar panels
 Specifications | About The Solar Ark—Sanyo
 Panasonic

Museums in Gifu Prefecture
Photovoltaic power stations in Japan
Science museums in Japan
Solar architecture
Panasonic
Anpachi, Gifu
Museums established in 2002
2002 establishments in Japan